Vat Green 9 is a green colored vat dye. It is derived from violanthrone.

References 

Polycyclic aromatic compounds
Ketones
Vat dyes
Nitro compounds